The 1976–77 Hellenic Football League season was the 24th in the history of the Hellenic Football League, a football competition in England.

Premier Division

The Premier Division featured 13 clubs which competed in the division last season, along with three new clubs, promoted from Division One:
Abingdon Town
Fairford Town
Hazells

League table

Division One

The Division One featured 10 clubs which competed in the division last season, along with 6 new clubs:
Didcot Town, relegated from the Premier Division
Wantage Town, relegated from the Premier Division
Bicester Town, relegated from the Premier Division
Flackwell Heath, joined from the High Wycombe and District League
Garrard Athletic
Dowty Staverton

League table

References

External links
 Hellenic Football League

1976-77
8